...And the Ever Expanding Universe is the third studio album by Canadian indie rock band The Most Serene Republic, released on July 14, 2009. The album title, track listing, and release date were all revealed by the band through their Arts & Crafts label on April 20, 2009. The album was produced and mixed by David Newfeld who also cowrites and performs on the release.

Track listing

References 

2009 albums
Arts & Crafts Productions albums
The Most Serene Republic albums